The 2015–16 FC Rostov season was the club's seventh successive season in the Russian Premier League, the highest tier of football in Russia. Rostov will also take part in the Russian Cup, entering at the Round of 32 stage.

Squad
Out on loan

Reserve squad

Transfers

Summer

In:

Out:

Winter

In:

Out:

Friendlies

Competitions

Russian Premier League

Results by round

Matches

League table

Russian Cup

Squad statistics

Appearances and goals

|-
|colspan="14"|Players away from the club on loan:|-
|colspan="14"|Players who appeared for Rostov no longer at the club:''
|}

Goal Scorers

Disciplinary Record

References

External links

FC Rostov seasons
Rostov